The Department of Social Development (DSD) of South Africa is a government department responsible for providing social development, protection, and welfare services to the public. Previously called the Department of Welfare, it was renamed in July 2000. The current Minister of Social Development is Lindiwe Zulu.

The first Department was established in 1937, to regulate and subsidise existing private, non-governmental welfare services, while providing some additional services. The 1997 White Paper for Social Welfare noted that post-Apartheid South Africa had inherited social welfare programmes which were “not considered to be critical social investment priorities and were under-resourced”.

The Department "endeavours to create a better life for the poor, vulnerable and excluded people in society". It is tasked with reducing poverty, promoting social integration, and creating conditions for sustainable livelihoods. The Department also conducts research that develops the social indicators necessary for programme implementation and public accountability.

South African Social Security Agency 

The South African Social Security Agency (SASSA) is a national agency of the government created in April 2005 in order to distribute social grants on behalf of the Department of Social Development.

Criticism 
Since the 1990s, welfare services have been allocated 10% of the Department’s overall budget. According to researcher Lisa Vetten, pay increases for the Department's civil servants have been consistently higher than inflation for the past 10 years; these increases have shrunk the budget for provision of services, and have correspondingly diminished funding to the non-governmental organisation (NGO) sector. She argues underfunding has created a two-tier system of care, in which government services are considerably better resourced than NGO counterparts. Further exacerbating NGOs’ situations is the Department's late payment of their subsidies.

Notes

Government departments of South Africa
Government agencies of South Africa
Social security in South Africa